CNBC on Assignment is a series of business reports running on the TV channel CNBC started in 2005.

The program's reports have included:
The Age of Wal-Mart, a report by David Faber about Wal-Mart
The eBay Effect, another report by David Faber about eBay
NASCAR Gold with Dylan Ratigan
God and Money, about religion and money in the U.S., with Tyler Mathisen
The Kingdom Built on Oil, a report done by Melissa Francis about Saudi Arabia and oil production
Rebellion in the Magic Kingdom, report about Disney's corporate governance conflicts, with Maria Bartiromo
Las Vegas, Inc with Dylan Ratigan about the businesses in and around the casinos of Las Vegas, Nevada

The music for CNBC on Assignment was made by 615 Music, a company from Nashville, Tennessee, that also made the music for the business day programs on CNBC.

References

CNBC original programming
Business-related television series